The 1927–28 Clarkson Golden Knights men's ice hockey season was the 8th season of play for the program. The team was coached by Gordon Croskery in his 5th season.

Season
After a fantastic season the year before, Clarkson saw a chance to prove how good it was and scheduled several games against the upper echelon of college hockey. This time the team got an early start on their season and began practicing just after Thanksgiving. The full month gave professor Croskery the opportunity to get the new players up to speed, but it was the returning crop that would prove vital for the team's success.

Clarkson opened at home against Victoria College. Three consecutive days of warm weather left the ice in poor shape but the teams fought through the conditions. "Light Horse Harry" Heintzman opened the scoring in the first but Tech was unable to add to the score in regulation. Fortunately, their defense was as reliable as it had been the year before and the Knights took the game into overtime. Near the end of the 10-minute session, MacCartney netted the winning goal and sent the Green and Gold faithful home happy. The team headed down to West Point for the second game and the result was much the same; Clarkson scored early and then relied on the twin towers of Wayland and MacCartney on the back end to shut down the opposing offense. It was only a strong game from the Army netminder, Browning, that prevented the score from being lopsided.

The third game of the season was the first big test for the program, as they met one of the 'Big Four' in Princeton. While the Tigers hadn't been champions in over a decade, the team was still formidable and got out to an early lead. Down 2–4 after 20 minutes, Clarkson bore down in the third and closed off Princeton's avenue of attack. On the offensive side, Fred Dion became an instant star; he scored twice in the first, three times in the second and then, after Princeton had ties the game early in the third, netted the final three goals to set a program record with 8 markers in the match. Tech kept rolling for the remainder of the month. They won their next four games, all against college teams, by a combined score of 21–1 with Dion earning two more hat-tricks.

When the team played host to Syracuse in early February, Clarkson ran their winning streak to 17 games and did so in style. Tech dominated the visitors through the entire game and set new program records for both goals scored (14) and margin of victory (+13). The game was so one-sided that Burke, who was starting at Left Wing in place of the absent Bill Guest, got enough ice time to score 5 goals. The winning streak came to an end the following week when Middlebury broke through Tech's vaunted defense and two of Clarkson's goals were waved off by the referee.

Clarkson ended the year with a trip downstate and took their frustrations out on their opponents. Dion recorded his 5th hat-trick of the season against Colgate and the whole team turned in a masterful performance against Hamilton. The win marked Tech's first victory over the Continentals in five attempts and gave the Knights the (unofficial) New York state championship.

Dion's individual performance over the season, particularly in the game against Princeton, earn him a spot on the All-American team, the first Clarkson player so honored.

Roster

Standings

Schedule and Results

|-
!colspan=12 style=";" | Regular Season

Scoring Statistics

Note: Assists were not recorded as a statistic.

Goaltending statistics

Note: GAA is based upon 60 minutes per game.

References

Clarkson Golden Knights men's ice hockey seasons
Clarkson
Clarkson
Clarkson
Clarkson